Keanan Brand (born 8 January 1999) is a professional rugby league footballer who plays as a  for the Leigh Leopards in the Betfred Super League.

He previously played for the Widnes Vikings in the Super League and the Betfred Championship, and for Warrington Wolves and Leigh Centurions (on loan) in the Super League.

In 2023, Brand appeared as a contestant on the ninth series of Love Island.

Background
Brand was born in Ormskirk, Lancashire, England.

Playing career

Widnes Vikings
In 2018 he made his Widnes début in the Super League against Hull Kingston Rovers. 

He featured 32 times in 2019 in all competitions for Widnes and was part of the team that made it to Wembley in the AB Sundecks 1895 cup final. He was also nominated for the Championship Young player of the year award.

Warrington Wolves
On 30 September 2019 it was announced that Brand had signed for the Warrington Wolves along with Anthony Gelling.

Leigh Leopards 
On 18 December 2020 newly promoted Leigh Leopards (then Leigh Centurions) signed Brand on  a season long loan from Warrington Wolves for the 2021 Betfred Super League season.

On 20 November 2021 it was announced that Brand had left Warrington Wolves and signed for Leigh Leopards in the Betfred Championship.

References

External links
Widnes Vikings profile
Ireland profile

1999 births
Living people
English rugby league players
Leigh Leopards players
Rugby league centres
Rugby league players from Lancashire
Warrington Wolves players
Widnes Vikings players